|}

The Fishery Lane Hurdle is a Grade 3 National Hunt hurdle race in Ireland which is open to horses aged four years. 
It is run at Naas over a distance of about 2 miles (3,218 metres), and it is scheduled to take place each year in November.

The race was first run in 2006, was awarded Listed status in 2007, then raised to Grade 3 in 2012. It was run as a Grade 2 race as a one-off in 2020.

Records
Leading jockey  (3 wins):
 Mark Walsh -  Early Doors (2017), Espoir d'Allen (2018), Brazil (2022) 

Leading trainer  (4 wins):
 Edward O'Grady -  Catch Me (2006), Torphichen (2009), Alaivan (2010), Kitten Rock (2014) 
 Gordon Elliott -  Miss Tata (2016), Surin (2019), Call Me Lyreen (2020), Teahupoo (2021)

Winners

See also
 Horse racing in Ireland
 List of Irish National Hunt races

References

Racing Post:

National Hunt hurdle races
National Hunt races in Ireland
Naas Racecourse
2006 establishments in Ireland
Recurring sporting events established in 2006